Heini Nettesheim (22 October 1915 – 18 October 2005) was a German wrestler. He competed at the 1936 Summer Olympics and the 1952 Summer Olympics.

References

1915 births
2005 deaths
German male sport wrestlers
Olympic wrestlers of Germany
Wrestlers at the 1936 Summer Olympics
Wrestlers at the 1952 Summer Olympics
Sportspeople from Cologne